Charles Frederick Henry Prince (11 September 1874 – 2 February 1949) was a South African cricketer who played in one Test in 1899.

Career
Prince was born in Boshof in Orange Free State, and attended Diocesan College in Rondebosch. A right-handed batsman and wicket-keeper, he played his first first-class match for Western Province in April 1895, when he opened the batting and kept wicket in the final of the Currie Cup. 

In later years he also played for Border and Eastern Province. His most successful match with the bat was in Border's four-wicket victory over Transvaal in 1897–98, when he opened the batting and made 60 and 61, the two highest scores on either side in the match. 

Prince's one Test match was the second match of the 1898–99 series against the English cricket team led by Lord Hawke. South Africa, having led by 85 on the first innings, were dismissed for just 35 in the second innings and lost the match by 210 runs. Prince, playing purely as a lower-order batsman, scored 5 and 1.

In 1901, Prince was a member of the South African side that visited England at the height of the Boer War. No Tests were played on that tour, but several matches were arranged against first-class counties. A few days before the tour began, Prince played a first-class match for W. G. Grace's London County team against Cambridge University. He played his last first-class matches in the 1904–05 season for Western Province.

References

External links
 

1874 births
1949 deaths
South Africa Test cricketers
South African cricketers
Western Province cricketers
Border cricketers
Eastern Province cricketers
London County cricketers